Mubarak Salem Al-Khater  is a Qatari football forward who played for Qatar in the 1984 Asian Cup and in 1984 Summer Olympics.

Record at International Tournaments

References

External links
Sport Reference Profile

Qatari footballers
Qatar international footballers
Olympic footballers of Qatar
Footballers at the 1984 Summer Olympics
1984 AFC Asian Cup players
1988 AFC Asian Cup players
1992 AFC Asian Cup players
1966 births
Living people
Qatar Stars League players
Association football midfielders